Zgornje Gorče is a settlement in the Lower Savinja Valley in the Municipality of Braslovče in Slovenia. The area is part of the traditional region of Styria. The municipality is now included in the Savinja Statistical Region.

References

External links
Zgornje Gorče on Geopedia

Populated places in the Municipality of Braslovče